Odisha Gramya Bank (OGB)  is a Regional Rural Bank established on 7 January 2013 with the amalgamation of Neelachala Gramya Bank (Odia: ନୀଳାଚଳ ଗ୍ରାମ୍ୟ ବ୍ଯାଙ୍କ), Kalinga Gramya Bank (Odia: କଳିଙ୍ଗ ଗ୍ରାମ୍ୟ ବ୍ଯାଙ୍କ) and Baitarani Gramya Bank (Odia: ବୈତରଣୀ ଗ୍ରାମ୍ୟ ବ୍ଯାଙ୍କ) in terms of provisions of Regional Rural Banks Act 1976. The bank is sponsored by Indian Overseas Bank & is jointly owned by the Government of India, Government of Odisha and IOB. It is under the ownership of Ministry of Finance , Government of India.

The shareholders of the Bank are Govt. of India (50%), Indian Overseas Bank (35%) and Govt. of Odisha (15%). The Bank is operating in 13 districts of Odisha State with its Head Office at Bhubaneswar. The bank has nine regional offices located at Balasore, Baripada, Cuttack, Chandikhol, Dhenkanal, Jashipur, Khurda, Keonjhar and Pipli.

History
The bank was established on 07.01.2013 with the branches of the erstwhile Neelachal, Kalinga and Baitarani RRBs. However, presently it has grown to a network of 547 branches, of which 446 are in remote rural areas.

Presently, the Bank operates in 13 districts of Coastal, Central and Northern Odisha viz. Puri, Khurda, Cuttack, Jajpur, Jagatsingpur, Nayagarh, Bhadrak, Baleswar, Kendrapada, Keonjhar, Mayurbhanj, Dhenkanal and Angul, covering 37% of the geographical area and 52% of the total population of Odisha State.

Performance
The bank made a profit of Rs 14.42 Crore in the year 2013–14. The bank had a CD ratio of 59.5% at the time of amalgamation.

In 2015, Odisha Gramya Bank came third in the ranking of all banks in Odisha on Financial Inclusion parameters, with a score of 67 out of 100, becoming eligible to handle Government business including State PSU deposits.

National prominence
Immediately after its inception, Odisha Gramya Bank came into national prominence with its fast-track solving of the high-profile gold loan fraud case involving Ratikant Kanungo.  The situation improved after the formation of Odisha Gramya Bank.

See also

 Banking in India
 List of banks in India
 Reserve Bank of India
 Regional Rural Bank
 Indian Financial System Code
 List of largest banks
 List of companies of India
 Make in India
 Utkal Grameen Bank

References

Regional rural banks of India
Banks established in 2013
Economy of Odisha
Indian companies established in 2013
2013 establishments in Odisha